Callopepla inachia is a moth of the subfamily Arctiinae. It was described by Schaus in 1892. It is found in Brazil and Argentina.

References

Arctiinae